The Chain Gang Vol. 2 is the second studio album by rap group State Property. It was released in August 2003 to positive reviews. Young Gunz' "Can't Stop Won't Stop" was later nominated for the 2003 Best Rap Performance by a Duo or Group Grammy Award.
The album sold 296,000 units The LP sold 69,000 in its first week

Track listing 
 "Can't Stop, Won't Stop" (Young Gunz)
 "It's On" (Beanie Sigel Featuring Jay-Z)
 "Temporary Relief" (Peedi Crakk & Omillio Sparks)
 "Rolling down the Freeway" (Freeway)
 "B.B. Gun" (Young Gunz, Beanie Sigel, Peedi Crakk & Oschino)
 "State Prop (You Know Us)" (Young Gunz & Beanie Sigel)
 "When You Hear That" (Beanie Sigel & Peedi Crakk Featuring Dirt McGirt)
 "Still in Effect" (Freeway & Neef)
 "Blow" (Oschino & Sparks & Young Chris Featuring Twista)
 "Been Down Too Long" (Oschino)
 "G.A.M.E." (Peedi Crakk, Beanie Sigel, & Young Chris Featuring Lil' Cease)
 "Just Another Nigga" (O & Sparks & Beanie Sigel)
 "Want Me Back" (O & Sparks, Young Chris, & Freeway)
 "See Clearly" (Peedi Crakk, Beanie Sigel, & Young Gunz)
 "If I Could Do It All Again" (O & Sparks)
 "Criminal Background" (Peedi Crakk & Young Chris)
 "94 Bars" (Young Chris) [bonus track]

Production 
 Darrel "Digga" Branch — track 1
 Deric "D-Dot" Angelettie — track 2
 Boola — track 3, 6
 Bink Dogg — track 4
 Chad Hamilton — track 5, 9, 13, 16, 17
 Sean "S Dot" Francis — track 7
 Spike & Jamahl — track 2
 The Alchemist — track 8
 Black Key — track 10
 Henny Loc — track 11
 Ruggedness — track 12
 Warryn Campbell — track 14
 Black Key — track 15
 Just Blaze - track 18, track 10 (co-producer)

Charts

Weekly charts

Year-end charts

References 

2003 albums
State Property (band) albums
Albums produced by the Alchemist (musician)
Albums produced by Bink (record producer)
Albums produced by Just Blaze
Roc-A-Fella Records albums